is a convenience store franchise chain in Japan established on December 21, 1977. The convenience store chain is owned by Yamazaki Baking Co., Ltd, Japan's largest baking company. Daily Yamazaki sells baked goods such as bread, pastries, and other confectioneries in both traditional Japanese and Western styles. They also carry magazines, manga comic books, soft drinks, onigiri, bento, and other goods.

Its top competitors are Lawson, 7-Eleven and FamilyMart.

External links
 
  (Japanese) 
 Yamazaki Baking Co. official homepage (Japanese)
 Yamazaki official English information homepage (English)

Retail companies established in 1977
Convenience stores of Japan